q Eridani refers to 2 distinct star systems in the constellation Eridanus:

 q1 Eridani, better known as HD 10647
 q2 Eridani, better known as HD 10939

Eridanus (constellation)
Eridani, Omicron